ISDN is a music album by experimental electronica artists The Future Sound of London which was released in two different versions in 1994 and 1995. The music on the album is edited together from various live broadcasts that the band had transmitted to radio stations all over the world using ISDN networking. At the time ISDN was a relatively new technology that had the bandwidth to carry high-quality digital audio. The band repeated the format in 1997 with the limited edition ISDN Show, another live album of ISDN broadcasts.

The album
Stylistically, the record features some of the ambience of their previous work, but brings in elements of hip-hop, trip-hop and acid jazz.

The two released versions have different track listings and cover art.  The limited edition, a 10,000-copy pressing released in December 1994, has a black cover.  The later release, which first appeared in June 1995, has a white cover with black writing, and a different track listing.

The album contains numerous references to several films such as Repo Man in "Eyes Pop - Skin Explodes - Everybody Dead" is a line spoken by the character J. Frank Parnell, and the track "It's My Mind That Works" samples Miller saying "you know the way everybody's into weirdness right now?" and "it's all part of a cosmic unconsciousness." There are also samples from the sci-fi epic movie Aliens in the track "Far Out Son Of Lung And The Ramblings Of A Madman", along with robotic sounds and laser-fire from the film The Black Hole in the track "Just a Fuckin Idiot", and samples from films Escape From New York, Predator and The Exorcist II scattered throughout the record.

Track listing

Limited edition
 "Just a Fuckin Idiot"  – 5:39
 "The Far out Son of Lung and the Ramblings of a Madman"  – 4:29
 "Appendage"  – 2:26
 "Slider"  – 7:22
 "Smokin Japanese Babe"  – 4:59
 "You're Creeping Me Out"  – 6:32
 "Eyes Pop - Skin Explodes - Everybody Dead"  – 3:45
 "It's My Mind That Works"  – 3:25
 "Dirty Shadows"  – 6:15
 "Tired"  – 6:32
 "Egypt"  – 4:11
 "Are They Fightin Us"  – 6:23
 "Hot Knives"  – 3:20
 "A Study of Six Guitars"  – 4:13
 "An End of Sorts"  – 5:26

Second edition
 "Just a Fuckin Idiot"  – 5:39
 "The Far out Son of Lung and the Ramblings of a Madman"  – 4:29
 "Appendage"  – 2:26
 "Slider"  – 7:22
 "Smokin Japanese Babe"  – 4:59
 "You're Creeping Me Out"  – 6:32
 "Eyes Pop - Skin Explodes - Everybody Dead"  – 3:45
 "It's My Mind That Works"  – 3:25
 "Dirty Shadows"  – 6:15
 "Tired"  – 6:32
 "Egypt"  – 4:11
 "Kai"  – 4:24
 "Amoeba"  – 5:21
 "A Study of Six Guitars"  – 4:13
 "Snake Hips"  – 5:52

Vinyl edition
 "Just a Fuckin Idiot"  – 5:39
 "The Far out Son of Lung and the Ramblings of a Madman"  – 4:29
 "Appendage"  – 2:26
 "Slider"  – 7:22
 "Smokin Japanese Babe"  – 4:59
 "You're Creeping Me Out"  – 6:32
 "Eyes Pop - Skin Explodes - Everybody Dead"  – 3:45
 "It's My Mind That Works"  – 3:25
 "Dirty Shadows"  – 6:15
 "Tired"  – 6:32
 "Egypt"  – 4:11
 "Are They Fightin Us"  – 6:23
 "Kai"  – 4:24
 "Amoeba"  – 5:21
 "A Study of Six Guitars"  – 4:13
 "Snake Hips"  – 5:52

Personnel
Written and produced by The Future Sound of London
Engineered by Yage for EBV
Recorded live at Earthbeat Studios, London 1995, during various ISDN transmissions
Guitar on "Dirty Shadows" was sourced from Robert Fripp live with FSOL, Radio 1 FM, on 14 May 1994.
John Williams - acoustic bass loops was sourced from the album Cavatina - put through the machines on "Smokin' Japanese Babe" & "Are They Fightin Us".
"Snake Hips" contains a horn sample from "Vegas El Bandito" and additional percussion loop from "Kundalini" by 23 Skidoo.
 "Slider" and "Kai" contain samples from "The Waiting Room" by Genesis (from the album The Lamb Lies Down on Broadway).

References

External links
 

The Future Sound of London live albums
1994 live albums
Astralwerks live albums